Count Henri Marie Ghislain de Merode (1782—1847) was a member of the Belgian Senate and writer.

Life
Henri de Merode was born in Brussels on 15 August 1782, the eldest of the four sons of Charles de Merode (1762–1830) and Marie d'Ongnies de Mastaing, princess of Grimbergen. He inherited the titles prince of Grimbergen, count of Merode and of the Holy Roman Empire, marquis of Westerloo and prince of Rubempre. He was also awarded the titles of Grandee of Spain and Grand Cordon of the Order of Leopold. Between the ages of 12 and 18 he was an émigré in Germany, returning with his father in 1800. On 26 August 1805 he married Louise-Jeanne de Thézan du Poujol (1787–1862).

Having declined to serve in public office under the United Kingdom of the Netherlands, Merode supported the aims of the Belgian Revolution, in which two of his brothers played an active role, but sat out the fighting on an estate in France. In the 1831 Belgian general election, the first since the declaration of independence in 1830, he was elected to the Belgian Senate. The following year, his wife was appointed a lady-in-waiting to Queen Louise. With a cousin, the marquis of Beaufort, he co-wrote De l'Esprit de vie et de l'Esprit de mort (Paris, 1833). In 1835, King Leopold sent him to Vienna as an extraordinary ambassador to extend condolences on the death of Francis II and congratulating Ferdinand I of Austria on his accession, while also officially communicating the birth of Leopold, Duke of Brabant (the future Leopold II of Belgium). Merode was re-elected  senator in 1839 but resigned his seat. He died in Brussels on 23 September 1847.

References

1782 births
1847 deaths
Writers of the Austrian Netherlands
People of the First French Empire
People of the United Kingdom of the Netherlands
19th-century Belgian politicians
Diplomats from Brussels
Merode family